Laivan Greene (born February 17, 1992) is an American actress, singer and dancer known for her roles in All of Us and Jump In!.

Early life and education 
Greene was born in Springfield, Massachusetts. She attended Orange Lutheran High School before earning a Bachelor of Science degree from the United States Military Academy in 2015 and a Master of Business Administration from Webster University in 2021.

Career 
Laivan Greene is best known for playing Keisha Ray in the Disney Channel Original Movie, Jump In!. She was also a series regular on the television show All of Us and played the role of "Braces" in Heroes. Laivan was a Field Artillery Captain in the United States Army retiring in 2020. She is currently pursuing her acting and singing career.

Filmography

Film

Television

References

External links

Cast bio on The CW

American television actresses
American female dancers
American dancers
Living people
1992 births
21st-century American singers
21st-century American women singers

United States Military Academy alumni
Webster University alumni